Rosička may refer to the following places in the Czech Republic:

 Rosička (Jindřichův Hradec District), village in Jindřichův Hradec District
 Rosička (Žďár nad Sázavou District), village in Žďár nad Sázavou District
 Hadravova Rosička, village in Jindřichův Hradec District